Zanonia is a monotypic genus in the flowering plant family Cucurbitaceae (the cucumber, squash, and pumpkin family).

The only species is Zanonia indica, a medium-sized liana found in the Indian Subcontinent and Southeast Asia east to New Guinea. It has a number of subspecies.

At one time a number of Alsomitra species were classified among the Zanonia.

References

External links
Flora of China - Cucurbitaceae 
Wind dispersal of seeds
 Andres, T. C. 2004. Web site for the plant family Cucurbitaceae & home of The Cucurbit Network.
 KBD: Kew Bibliographic Databases of Royal Botanic Gardens, Kew. 
Gourds afloat: a dated phylogeny reveals an Asian origin of the gourd family (Cucurbitaceae) and numerous oversea dispersal events

Cucurbitaceae
Monotypic Cucurbitaceae genera
Flora of Asia